Liu is a common Chinese surname.

Liu, LIU, or liu may also refer to:
 Liǔ, a Chinese surname
 , a state during the Zhou Dynasty of ancient China
 Liu, Estonia, a village in Gulf of Riga, north Europe
 Liù, the slave girl in Turandot
 Laureate International Universities
 Lebanese International University, Lebanon
 Linköping University, Sweden
 Long Island University, New York, United States
 Lughat il-Ishaarah il-Urduniah, the Jordanian name for Levantine Arabic Sign Language or Syro-Jordanian Sign Language

See also